Colonel Abrams is the self-titled debut studio album by American musician Colonel Abrams, released in 1985 through MCA Records. Most of the songs were written by Abrams and his brother, Marston Freeman.

Commercial performance
The album peaked at No. 13 on the R&B albums chart. It also reached No. 75 on the Billboard 200. The album features the singles "Trapped", which peaked at No. 20 on the Hot Soul Singles chart and No. 1 on the Hot Dance/Disco chart, and "I'm Not Gonna Let", which reached No. 7 on the Hot Soul Singles chart and No. 1 on the Hot Dance/Disco chart. In addition, all the cuts of the album reached the top of the Hot Dance/Disco chart.

Track listing

Personnel
Steven Machat - executive producer
Gianni Versace - "clothes and location"
Chris Duffy - photography

Charts

Weekly charts

Year-end charts

Singles

References

External links

1985 debut albums
Colonel Abrams albums
MCA Records albums